Harry Douglas is an American football player.

Harry Douglas(s) may also refer to:

Harry Douglas (English footballer), Darlington full back of the 1900s
Harry Douglass, British trade unionist

See also
Harold Douglas (disambiguation)
Henry Douglas (disambiguation)